Devas may refer to:

 Devas Club, a club in south London
 Anthony Devas (1911–1958), British portrait painter
 Charles Stanton Devas (1848–1906), political economist
 Jocelyn Devas (died 1886), founder of the Devas Club
 Devas (band), Romanian music band
 Dewas, a city in Madhya Pradesh, India

See also 
 Deva (disambiguation)